Mirko Kos (born 12 April 1997) is an Austrian professional footballer who plays as a goalkeeper for Austria Wien.

Career
Kos is a youth product of Mürzzuschlag and Kapfenberger SV, before joining the youth academy of Austria Wien in 2012. He was promoted to Austria Wien's reserves in 2016, and to their senior team in 2017 signing a professional contract with them. He generally acts as the reserve goalkeeper for Austria Wien, occasionally playing for their reserves as needed. He made his professional debut with them in a 1–0 Austrian Football Bundesliga win over Mattersburg on 7 April 2020.

References

External links
 
 OEFB Profile

1997 births
Living people
People from Mürzzuschlag
Austrian footballers
FK Austria Wien players
Austrian Football Bundesliga players
2. Liga (Austria) players
Austrian Regionalliga players
Association football goalkeepers
Austrian people of Polish descent